KKWZ is an FM radio station broadcasting on a frequency of 95.3 MHz.  The format of KKWZ is known as KOOL AC 95.3 FM.

KKWZ is licensed to the city of Rugby, North Dakota and is owned by Rugby Broadcasters, Inc. Its studios and transmitter are at 230 Hwy 2 SE in Rugby, shared with sister station KZZJ.

References

External links

Radio stations established in 2014
Mainstream adult contemporary radio stations in the United States
2014 establishments in North Dakota
KWZ
Rugby, North Dakota